The Government Gardens is a public park, partly laid out as gardens, located beside Lake Rotorua in central Rotorua, Bay of Plenty, North Island, New Zealand. It was built by the government as a tourism attraction, and is still a major tourism destination in New Zealand.

Facilities 
The Rotorua Museum, housed in the former Bath House building, looks over the Government Gardens. There are sports facilities, including the Blue Baths swimming pool, a bowling green, and a croquet lawn. There is also a bandstand. The Polynesian Spa is close by, beside Lake Rotorua.

History 
Part of the site was known to the Māori people as Paepaehakumanu and the northern part as Motutara. The area known as Paepaehakumanu was a bird-snaring ground, which led to its name. The area is of historical significance to the local Maori, with battles having been fought here. The Maori gave 50 acres of the land to the British Crown in the late 1800s. The combined Paepaehakumanu and Motutara area became known as the Sanatorium Reserve, or more commonly, the Government Gardens.

The Government of New Zealand opened a large bath house here in 1908. A second building, the Blue Baths, opened in 1933, amidst much controversy, as mixed bathing was accommodated. The Blue Baths were closed in 1982, and restored in 1999–2000. The original 1908 Bath House closed to bathing in 1966. The building was extensively renovated in 1995 and converted into a museum.

Heritage registrations
A number of items are covered by formal registrations by Heritage New Zealand. The former Bath House, now Rotorua Museum, and the Blue Baths have Category I registrations. Four structures have Category II registrations, including the Prince's Arch and Gateway which was built for the 1901 royal visit of the Duke and Duchess of York; this structure is now unique in New Zealand. The area as a whole is also covered by a Historic Area registration.

References 

Tourist attractions in Rotorua
Gardens in New Zealand
Parks in New Zealand
Sport in Rotorua
Heritage New Zealand Category 1 historic places in the Bay of Plenty Region
Heritage New Zealand Category 2 historic places in the Bay of Plenty Region
Heritage New Zealand historic areas in the Bay of Plenty Region